The 2005 National Lacrosse League season is the 19th season of the NLL that began on January 1, 2005 and concluded with the championship game on May 14. The Toronto Rock won their fifth NLL championship, defeating the Arizona Sting 19–13 in Toronto.

Colin Doyle of the Toronto Rock won the scoring title, marking the first time since 1990 that someone other than Gary Gait, Paul Gait, or John Tavares has led the league in scoring. For his efforts in leading the Rock to the championship, Doyle was named both league MVP and Championship Game MVP.

Just hours after the Rock's championship victory, another lacrosse legend, former Toronto head coach and general manager Les Bartley died from colon cancer at age 51.  Bartley had coached the Buffalo Bandits to three MILL/NLL championships before moving to the expansion Ontario Raiders in 1998. Bartley moved with the Raiders to Toronto the next year, and went on to win titles in four of the next five seasons. Bartley also won the NLL Executive of the Year award in 2005, in part due to his involvement in the negotiation of the new CBA.

The 2005 season featured the NLL retirement of two lacrosse legends: Gary Gait and Tom Marechek. Marechek played his entire 12-year career with the Philadelphia Wings, winning Rookie of the Year in 1994, as well as four championships with the Wings. He was named to the All-Pro team eight times, and is third all-time in the NLL in points, after only Gary Gait and John Tavares . Marechek announced his retirement shortly before the end of the season.

Gait, at the time the league's all-time leading scorer, announced his retirement shortly before the season began. He was named League MVP six times, won seven scoring titles, and was named an All-Pro an astonishing 14 times in 14 seasons. With four games left in the regular season, Gait managed to coax his twin brother Paul out of retirement to play with him. However, Colorado was eliminated in the division semi-finals by Arizona, so Gait's dream of winning the championship in his final season did not come to fruition. He did win the championship in his first year as head coach of the Mammoth the next year.

Labour dispute
The collective bargaining agreement (CBA) between the league and the Professional Lacrosse Players' Association (PLPA) expired at the end of the 2004 season, and negotiations for a new CBA took place over the summer. However, these negotiations did not result in a new agreement, and the NLL even accused the PLPA of negotiating in bad faith. The league made its "last, best, and final offer" to the PLPA on September 29, 2004, and announced that if this offer was not accepted by the players, the season would be officially cancelled on October 2.

Marathon negotiations continued until early morning on October 1, and resulted in two different proposals. Both were presented to the players that day with the stipulation that if neither of them was acceptable, the season would be cancelled. One of the two proposals (a three-year deal) was accepted, and the season went on as scheduled.

Team movement
The season featured a new team added to the East division, and one removed from the West. The ownership of the Minnesota Wild NHL team purchased the rights to the old Montreal Express franchise, moving it to Minnesota and renaming it the Minnesota Swarm, while the Vancouver Ravens franchise was removed from the schedule less than three weeks before the start of the season.

Milestones
February 10: Buffalo Bandits legend John Tavares became the first player in league history to reach 500 assists, as the Bandits defeated the Anaheim Storm 20–9.
February 18: Tavares reaches another milestone in his very next game, scoring his 1000th point in an 11–7 defeat of Rochester. Tavares becomes only the second player ever to reach that milestone, following Gary Gait.

Final standings

Regular season

Playoffs

Toronto hosted the championship game.

All Star Game
The 2005 All-Star Game was held at the Pengrowth Saddledome in Calgary, Alberta on February 26, 2005. The East division defeated the West 11–10 in a thrilling overtime game. John Tavares scored the winner, and hometown captain Tracy Kelusky was named game MVP.

All-Star teams

Awards

Annual

All-Pro Teams
Reference:

First Team
 Colin Doyle, Toronto
 John Grant, Jr., Rochester
 John Tavares, Buffalo
 Dan Dawson, Arizona
 Steve Dietrich, Buffalo
 Andrew Turner, Rochester

Second Team
 Gary Gait, Colorado
 Blaine Manning, Toronto
 Josh Sanderson, Toronto
 Jim Veltman, Toronto
 Bob Watson, Toronto
 Tracey Kelusky, Calgary

All-Rookie Team
Reference: 
 Ryan Boyle, San Jose
 Delby Powless, Buffalo
 Andrew Burkholder, Philadelphia
 Rory Glaves, Anaheim
 Ryder Bateman, Minnesota
 Dan Finck, Philadelphia

Weekly awards
The NLL gives out awards weekly for the best overall player, best offensive player, best defensive player, and best rookie.

Monthly awards 
Awards are also given out monthly for the best overall player and best rookie.

Statistics leaders
Bold numbers indicate new single-season records. Italics indicate tied single-season records.

See also 
 2005 in sports

References

External links
2005 Archive at the Outsider's Guide to the NLL
Standings from pointstreak.com
Scoring Leaders from pointstreak.com
Goalie Leaders from pointstreak.com

05
National Lacrosse League